Pedro Romero Precord (born 12 August 1937) is a Mexican former football midfielder who played for Mexico in the 1962 FIFA World Cup. He also played for Deportivo Toluca.

References

External links
FIFA profile

1937 births
Mexican footballers
Mexico international footballers
Association football midfielders
Deportivo Toluca F.C. players
1962 FIFA World Cup players
Living people